T.O.Y. (Trademark of Youth) is a German futurepop/synthpop band headed by Volker Lutz.  The project originated as electro-industrial band Evils Toy until a change in membership and sound style precipitated the rebranding in the year 2000.

History

As Evils Toy
Evils Toy started out in 1992 as the project of Volker Lutz and Thorsten Brenda. Thorsten and Volker were introduced by a mutual friend who knew that each of the duo were heavily into industrial music and were already working on music of their own. After completing several tracks together they sent a demo tape to several labels, including the German Hypnobeat label (a sub-label of Hyperium Records) who released their debut album Human Refuse at the end of 1993. Their second full-length release, Morbid Mind, was released a year later and was recorded at André Schmechta's T.G.I.F. Studios, known for recording works by André's project X-Marks the Pedwalk and many other well-known German EBM and industrial bands. This studio collaboration with André also yielded an XMTP remix of "Dear God" that was included on the album.

Their combination of distorted vocals and EBM rhythms with occasional touches of melody proved relatively successful, though their real breakthrough came in 1995 with their "Organics" single, which received significant airplay on both sides of the Atlantic. Organics, and the follow-on album XTC Implant, demonstrated a new sound for the band, integrating a high energy techno style into their typical dark electro that stood apart from their contemporaries at the time. XTC Implant proved to have a lasting and influential effect on the EBM scene.

The Illusion album, released in 1997, was the last album by this act that might accurately be defined as "industrial". Angels Only!, released the following year, moved away from distorted vocals and towards a more synthpop style. This was the first Evils Toy recording to feature Oliver Taranczewski, as well as the last recorded with Thorsten Brenda. For background vocals and live keyboards Volker brought in his long-time girlfriend Cordula K, who also appears in the videos for "Virtual State" and "Dream With Me". 

The addition of Taranczewski to the band in 1997 brought with him lyrical inspiration from the stories of H. P. Lovecraft to infuse into the band's sci-fi ethic. Lyrics on several tracks on Angels Only! — "Back On Earth," "From Above Comes Sleep," and "Colours Out Of Space" — drew directly from Lovecraftian themes of the Great Old Ones, R'lyeh, and the text The Colour Out of Space respectively. Taranczewski continued to weave these themes into the remaining Evils Toy releases and into early T.O.Y. songs as well.

The album Silvertears was released on E-Wave Records (with distribution through BMG) in 2000 and was the last release under the name Evils Toy. The project was known as "T.O.Y." thereafter.

As T.O.Y.
In 2001 the band renamed then released their first album, Space Radio, through E-Wave/BMG. That year they toured with De/Vision for 28 dates across Europe. Their second album under the new name, White Lights, continued the "softer" tone of the previous album.

The band have produced many remixes for other bands like Apoptygma Berzerk, In Strict Confidence, De/Vision and !Bang Elektronika. Volker also used his SonicStage Recording Studios to record and produce works by bands such as And One, L'Âme Immortelle, and Funker Vogt.

In 2004 Volker made a song for the German radio play The three investigators song contest. Also in 2004, the computer game company Konami used a song produced by T.O.Y. on the PS2 & Xbox release Dance Dance Revolution Ultramix 2. The track was a remix of the DDR and Beatmania IIDX song "I Feel..." by game music composer, Akira Yamaoka. Bands like Neuropa, Echo Image, Alien#Six13 and Midihead also contributed to the soundtrack.

In 2005 Taranczewski released an album with Stephan Voigt of the band Plastic under the name Yavin 4, an album sounding more like the older Evils Toy releases mixed with modern dance and drum & bass elements. He also produced the Cruciform Injection album Aftermath that was released in 2006.

In May 2009 Taranczewski left the band for good. Volker said he would finish the album, entitled Pain is Love, on his own. After Taranczewski's departure, Markus Helmert and Christian "Léo" Leonhardt joined Volker, playing keyboards and drums, respectively.

In September 2014, Helmert quit the band due to health reasons. About the same time, Taranczewski re-joined the band as a keyboardist, while Leonhardt was replaced by Marc A. Nathaniel on drums.  The new lineup continued to work on finishing the long delayed album, Pain is Love, as well playing live gigs.

In March 2017 Taranczewski again left the band for personal reasons. Helge Wiegand, a songwriter from Cologne and also keyboard player and vocalist of the band Diorama, joined the band in April 2017. That Summer the album Pain is Love was finally released. Later that year the band headlined the XV Synthetic Snow Festival in Moscow, Russia.

In 2019, T.O.Y. released a two-track single, "Silent Soldiers", on the Swedish Progress Productions label. Videos were filmed for the tracks by director Rytis Titas on location in Lithuania and were inspired by the aesthetics of the series Stranger Things.

Members
Volker Lutz (vocals, arrangements, programming, producer).
Helge Wiegand (keyboards, vocals)
Marc A. Nathaniel (drums).

Previous members
Thorsten Brenda (keyboards).
Cordula K. (vocals, keyboards).
Christian "Léo" Leonhardt (drums).
Markus Helmert (keyboards).
Oliver Taranczewski (lyrics, keyboards)

Discography

As Evils Toy

Compilation appearances (as Evils Toy)

As T.O.Y.

Compilation appearances (as T.O.Y)

References

External links

 Official Website
 T.O.Y. on Facebook
 
 

Video game musicians
German industrial music groups
German synthpop groups
Musical groups established in 1992
Metropolis Records artists